Denison Cumberland  was an 18th-century Anglican bishop in Ireland.

He was nominated Bishop of Clonfert and Kilmacduagh on 19 April 1763 and consecrated on 19 June that year; and translated to Kilmore on 6 March 1772. He died in office in November 1774 and was buried in the grounds of Kilmore Cathedral on 22 November 1774. He was a grandson of Richard Cumberland, and married Johanna Bentley, daughter of Richard Bentley. Their daughter was Mary Alcock.

References

Bishops of Clonfert and Kilmacduagh
Anglican bishops of Kilmore
1774 deaths
Year of birth unknown
Place of birth missing
Place of death missing